Songs of Death and Resurrection is the eleventh studio album from American heavy metal band Demon Hunter, released by Solid State Records on March 5, 2021. Three singles were released ahead of the album. This album mainly features acoustic renditions of the band's earlier songs such as "Dead Flowers" and "The Heart of a Graveyard", as well as featuring a previously unreleased song, "Praise the Void".

Track listing

Personnel 
Demon Hunter
 Ryan Clark – vocals, art direction and design for Invisible Creature, Inc. 
 Patrick Judge – acoustic lead guitar
 Jeremiah Scott – acoustic rhythm guitar, additional vocals on "Dead Flowers", "Deteriorate", "The Tide Began to Rise", studio photography
 Jon Dunn – acoustic bass guitar
 Timothy "Yogi" Watts – drums, additional vocals on "Dead Flowers", "Deteriorate", "The Tide Began to Rise"

Additional personnel
 Peggy Clark - additional vocals on "Loneliness", "Dead Flowers"
 Joanna Ott - piano, additional vocals on "Dead Flowers", "The Tide Began to Rise"
 Chris Carmichael - strings arrangements
 Eliran Kantor - artwork painted

References 

Demon Hunter albums
2021 albums
Solid State Records albums